Elizabeth Young is a Chick lit and contemporary romance writer.

Her novel Asking for Trouble was the basis for the 2005 film The Wedding Date. It was directed by Clare Kilner, starring Debra Messing and Dermot Mulroney, with supporting roles by Amy Adams and Holland Taylor.

Bibliography
Sorted by publishing house and release date :

With Arrow Books

Fair Game, January 2001,

With HarperCollins

Asking For Trouble, September 2002, 
A Promising Man (and About Time Too), November 2002,

With Avon

A Girl's Best Friend, August 2003, 
Making Mischief, October 2005,

See also
The Wedding Date, 2005 movie based on the novel Asking for Trouble.

External links
Elizabeth Young's page on HarperCollins (Official publisher web page)

Chick lit writers
Living people
Year of birth missing (living people)